State Route 226 (SR 226), also known as Airport Road, is a  north–south state highway in Hardin County, Tennessee.

Route description

SR 226 begins just south of Walkertown at an intersection with SR 128. It goes through wooded areas to pass through Maddox, where it has an intersection with SR 69 and passes by the Savannah-Hardin County Airport. The highway then turns northward through farmland to enter Olivet and have a short concurrency with SR 203. SR 226 then comes to an end shortly thereafter at an intersection with US 64/SR 128 (SR 15). The entire route of SR 226 is a two-lane highway.

Major intersections

References

226
Transportation in Hardin County, Tennessee